Bjørner Drøger (2 August 1912 – 2 February 2003) was a Danish rower. He competed in two events at the 1936 Summer Olympics.

References

1912 births
2003 deaths
Danish male rowers
Olympic rowers of Denmark
Rowers at the 1936 Summer Olympics
Rowers from Copenhagen